Stigmella semiaurea is a moth of the family Nepticulidae. It is found in Turkmenistan and Tajikistan.

The larvae feed on Acer species.

External links
Revised Check-List Of Mining Lepidoptera (Nepticuloidea, Tischerioidea And Gracillarioidea) From Central Asia

Nepticulidae
Moths of Asia
Moths described in 1988